Mark Blount (born 5 January 1974) is an English former footballer who played as a defender. Born in Derby, he played for Sheffield United and Peterborough United in the Football League, and had spells with Gresley Rovers, Scarborough and Burton Albion in non-league.

Career
Blount was signed for Sheffield United by manager Dave Bassett in February 1994 for a fee of £12,500 from Gresley Rovers. He was never able to make the break into the first team and was eventually released in 1996 upon the arrival of Howard Kendall as the new Blades manager, having made only fifteen appearances in total.  Following his release he spent some time with Scarborough and Peterborough United before finishing his career at Burton Albion.

References

External links

1974 births
Living people
Footballers from Derby
Association football defenders
English Football League players
Gresley F.C. players
Sheffield United F.C. players
Peterborough United F.C. players
Scarborough F.C. players
Burton Albion F.C. players
English footballers